The Sutta Piṭaka (also referred to as Sūtra Piṭaka or Suttanta Piṭaka; English: Basket of Discourse) is the second of the three divisions of the Tripiṭaka, the definitive canonical collection of scripture of Theravada Buddhism. The other two parts of the Tripiṭaka are the Vinaya Piṭaka and the Abhidhamma Piṭaka. The Sutta Pitaka contains more than 10,000 suttas (teachings) attributed to the Buddha or his close companions.

Origins 
What was later to become the written scripture of the Sutta Pitaka was first orally rehearsed by Buddha’s cousin Ananda at the first Buddhist council that was held shortly after the Buddha's death. The first council also defined the set of rules (Vinaya) that governed the life of monks and nuns within the monastic community. Tradition holds that little was added to the Canon after this. Scholars are more skeptical, but differ in their degrees of skepticism. Richard Gombrich thinks most of the first four nikayas (see below) go back to the Buddha, in content but not in form. The late Professor Hirakawa Akira says that the First Council collected only short prose passages or verses expressing important doctrines, and that these were expanded into full length suttas over the next century.

Contents 

There are five nikayas (collections) of suttas:
 Digha Nikāya, the "long" discourses.
 Majjhima Nikāya, the "middle-length" discourses.
 Saṁyutta Nikāya, the "connected" discourses.
 Anguttara Nikāya, the "numerical" discourses.
 Khuddaka Nikāya, the "minor collection".

Digha Nikāya 

This includes The Greater Discourse on the Foundations of Mindfulness, The Fruits of the Contemplative Life, and The Buddha's Last Days. There are 34 long suttas in this nikaya.

Majjhima Nikāya 

This includes Shorter Exposition of Kamma, Mindfulness of Breathing, and Mindfulness of the Body. There are 152 medium-length suttas in this nikaya.

Samyutta Nikaya 

There are, according to one reckoning, 2,889, but according to the commentary 7,762, shorter suttas in this Nikaya.

Anguttara Nikāya 

These teachings are arranged numerically. It includes, according to the commentary's reckoning, 9,565 short suttas grouped by number from ones to elevens. According to Keown, "there is considerable disparity between the Pāli and the Sarvāstivādin versions, with more than two-thirds of the sūtras found in one but not the other compilation, which suggests that much of this portion of the Sūtra Piṭaka was not formed until a fairly late date."

Khuddaka Nikāya 

This is a heterogeneous mix of sermons, doctrines, and poetry attributed to the Buddha and his disciples. The contents vary somewhat between editions. The Thai edition includes 1-15 below, the Sinhalese edition 1-17 and the Burmese edition 1-18.
 Khuddakapatha
 Dhammapada
 Udana
 Itivuttaka
 Suttanipata
 Vimanavatthu
 Petavatthu
 Theragatha
 Therigatha
 Jataka
 Niddesa
 Patisambhidamagga
 Apadana
 Buddhavamsa
 Cariyapitaka
 Nettipakarana or Netti
 Petakopadesa
 Milinda Panha
For more on these editions also see Pali Canon

Translations 
 The first four nikayas and more than half of the fifth have been translated by the Pali Text Society.
 The first four have also been translated in the Teachings of the Buddha series by Wisdom Publications.
 The first four nikayas, as well as six books from the Khuddaka Nikāya, have been translated from the Pali by Ṭhānissaro Bhikkhu and released under a Creative Commons license, and are available at dhammatalks.org

Selections (including material from at least two nikayas):

 Buddhist Suttas, ed & tr T. W. Rhys Davids, Sacred Books of the East, volume XI, Clarendon/Oxford, 1881; reprinted by Motilal Banarsidass, Delhi (& ?Dover, New York)
 The Word of the Buddha, ed & tr Nyanatiloka, 1935
 Early Buddhist Poetry, ed I. B. Horner, Ananda Semage, Colombo, 1963
 The Book of Protection, tr Piyadassi, Buddhist Publication Society, Kandy, Sri Lanka, 1981; translation of the paritta
 In the Buddha's Words, ed & tr Bodhi, Wisdom Pubns, 2005
 Early Buddhist Discourses, ed & tr John J. Holder, 2006
 Sayings of the Buddha, ed & tr Rupert Gethin, Oxford University Press, 2008
 Basic Teachings of the Buddha, ed & tr Glenn Wallis, New York: Random House, 2007

See also 

 Abhidhamma Pitaka
 Access to Insight
 Buddhist Publication Society
 Dhamma Society Fund
 List of suttas
 Pāli Canon
 Pali Text Society
 Pariyatti (bookstore)
 Vinaya Pitaka

Notes

External links 
SuttaCentral Public domain translations in multiple languages from the Pali Tipitaka as well as other collections, focusing on Early Buddhist Texts.
 Access to Insight translations of Pali Suttas
 How old is the Sutta Pitaka? - Alexander Wynne, St John's College, Oxford University, 2003.

 
Theravada Buddhist texts